"Country Music is Here to Stay" is the first single by singer Ferlin Husky with Capitol Records under the pseudonym Simon Crum.  The song peaked at No. 2 on Billboard Hot Country Songs chart for three weeks.

Chart performance

References

1958 singles
Ferlin Husky songs
1958 songs
Song articles with missing songwriters
Capitol Records singles